Val is a rural locality (a village) in Aserkhovskoye Rural Settlement, Sobinsky District, Vladimir Oblast, Russia. The population was 13 as of 2010.

Geography 
Val is located 11 km east of Sobinka (the district's administrative centre) by road. Kadyevo is the nearest rural locality.

References 

Rural localities in Sobinsky District